Cwmaman Colliery Halt railway station served the village of Cwmaman, in the historical county of Glamorganshire, Wales, from 1906 to 1932 on the Vale of Neath Railway.

History 
The station was opened to the workers of the nearby Cwmaman Colliery in 1903 by the Great Western Railway. It opened to regular passenger traffic on 1 January 1906 and closed to passengers on 22 September 1924. It closed to workers in 1932.

References 

Disused railway stations in Rhondda Cynon Taf
Former Great Western Railway stations
Railway stations in Great Britain opened in 1906
Railway stations in Great Britain closed in 1924
1903 establishments in Wales
1932 disestablishments in Wales